Genocide advocacy may refer to:

Anti-genocide advocacy:
Prevention of genocide
Commemoration of genocide
Genocide education
Pro-genocide advocacy:
Incitement to genocide 
Genocide justification
 Genocide denial

Genocide